Spondias is a genus of flowering plants in the cashew family, Anacardiaceae. The genus consists of 17 described species, 7 of which are native to the Neotropics and about 10 are native to tropical Asia. They are commonly named hog plums, Spanish plums, libas in Bikol and in some cases golden apples for their brightly colored fruit which resemble an apple or small plum at a casual glance. They are only distantly related to apple and plum trees, however. A more unequivocal common name is mombins.

In Cambodia, Spondias pinnata is called /pɷːn siː pʰlaɛ/ (ពោនស៊ីផ្លែ) or /məkaʔ prẹj/ (ម្កាក់ព្រៃ), and Spondias dulcis simply /məkaʔ/ (ម្កាក់). Spondias pinnata is called Pulicha kaai in the Tamil language, which means "sour fruit." It is also called "Amate Kaai" in the Kannada language, Ambade in Tulu and Konkani. In Sri Lanka it is called Amberella. In Bangladesh it is known as Aamra (আমড়া) and when served with seasonings it is a very popular street food.

Description
They are deciduous or semi-evergreen trees growing to 25 m tall. The leaves are spirally arranged, pinnate, rarely bipinnate or simple. The fruit is a drupe similar to a small mango (in the related genus Mangifera), 4–10 cm long, ripening yellow or orange. It has a single seed.

The Malesian species of Spondias were revised by Ding Hou in 1978. The most recently recognized species, Spondias testudinis, was described in 1998.

As food

About 10 species of Spondias bear edible fruits and have been domesticated for fruit production. These fruits are also consumed by herbivorous mammals such as deer.

In the Western Ghats of Karnataka flower buds and tender fruits are used in pickle preparation.
In Thai cuisine both the fruits and the tender leaves are eaten. In Odisha its called ambada, the fruit is used as a souring agent in curries.

Selected species
, Plants of the World online has 19 accepted species:

Selected synonyms include:

 Spondias cytherea  — synonym of Spondias dulcis
 Spondias haplophylla  — synonym of Bouea oppositifolia 
 Spondias indica  — synonym of  Solenocarpus indicus 
 Spondias lakonensis  — synonym of Allospondias lakonensis

References

External links

 
Anacardiaceae genera
Fruit trees